Austrocactus coxii is a plant species in the genus Austrocactus from the cactus family (Cactaceae), indigenous to southern Argentina and southern Chile. It grows as short columnar stems up to 5 cm diameter, reaching 60 cm in height, with 6-10 tuberculate ribs. Central spines are hard, straight or slightly hooked, light brown to whitish and up to 4 cm long. Thin spines are interwoven and range from 6 to 10 in number; each is up to  1 cm long. Its diurnal red flowers are up to 3.5 cm in diameter.

Synonyms 
 Austrocactus intertextus
 Echinocactus coxii
 Echinocactus intertextus
 Malacocarpus coxii
 Malacocarpus intertextus

References 

 GBIF entry
 CactiGuide entry
 Desert Tropicals entry

Cactoideae
Cacti of South America
Flora of Argentina
Flora of Chile